Arledge may refer to:

 Arledge Field, a public airport in Stamford, Texas
 Arledge Mounds I and II, a pair of registered historic structures near Circleville, Ohio
 Roone Arledge (1931–2002), an American sports broadcaster